Ugia duplicilinea is a species of moth in the family Erebidae. It is found in Ivory Coast and Nigeria.

References

Moths described in 1926
Ugia
Moths of Africa